AFL Barwon Women's Football is a women's Australian rules football competition based in the greater Geelong region. The first season of senior football held for women in the area was 2018.

Background

AFL Barwon is the governing body overseeing Australian rules football in the Geelong and greater district. After many years in which only junior girl's competitions were organised, a senior women's football competition commenced in 2018. Rather than being organised by the GFL, GDFL, or the BFL, the competition is managed under the AFL Barwon banner.

2018 competing teams:
 Bellarine Football League:
 Barwon Heads; Drysdale; Geelong Amateur; Ocean Grove
 Geelong Football League:
 Grovedale; Lara; St Joseph's; St Mary's
 Geelong & District Football League:
 Bell Post Hill; Geelong West Giants; North Geelong 
 Colac & District Football League:
 Colac Imperials

The competition has held grading games at the start of the seasons in both 2018, 2021 and 2022 in order to compose divisions to try to make matches as competitive as possible.

Premiers
Division 1
 2018 — North Geelong
 2019 — St Mary's
 2020 — Season cancelled due to ongoing COVID-19 pandemic in Australia.
 2021 — Not awarded
 2022 — Geelong Amateur
Division 2
 2018 — Barwon Heads
 2019 — North Geelong
 2020 — Season cancelled due to ongoing COVID-19 pandemic in Australia.
 2021 — Not awarded
 2022 — St Joseph's
Division 3
 2021 — Not awarded
 2022 — Anglesea

Ladders and Finals Results

2018  

Note: Drysdale and St Joseph's started the season in Division 1

2019

2020  

Season cancelled due to ongoing COVID-19 pandemic in Australia.

2021 
On 19 September 2021, due to ongoing restrictions caused by the COVID-19 pandemic in Victoria, AFL Barwon was forced to cancel the remaining weeks of the competitions without premierships being awarded.

2022 

Source:

Best and Fairest Award
Division 1
 2018 — Charlotte Thorne (North Geelong) 39 votes
 2019 — Stephanie Abfalter (Geelong Amateur) 19 votes
 2021 — Isabella Hill (Grovedale) 21 votes
 2022 — Alana Tully (Grovedale)

Division 2
 2018 — Emma Allen (Barwon Heads) 23 votes
 2019 — Charlotte Thorne (North Geelong) 27 votes
 2021 — Temikka Beeston (North Geelong) 18 votes
 2022 — Tara Smith (Drysdale)

Division 3
 2021 — Charlotte Simpson (St Joseph's) 18 votes
 2022 — Maggie Caudullo

Leading Goalkickers
Division 1
 2018 — Ashleigh Bond (St Mary's) 28 goals
 2019 — Ashleigh Bond (St Mary's) 23 goals
 2021 — Bianca Cheever (St Mary's) & Rhianna Arnold (Geelong Amateur) 16 goals
 2022 — Allesha McLean (St Mary's) 25 goals

Division 2
 2018 — Teagan Barber (Colac Imperials) 23 goals
 2019 — Melissa Egan (Drysdale) 61 goals
 2021 — Melissa Egan (Drysdale) 20 goals
 2022 — Bianca Deckker (Drysdale) 28 goals

Division 3
 2021 — Charlotte Simpson (St Joseph's), Rebekah Lane (South Barwon) & Camille King (Anglesea) 21 goals
 2022 — Rebekah Lane (South Barwon) 28 goals

Grand Final Best on Ground
Division 1
 2022 – Cheryl de Groot (Geelong Amateurs)

Division 2
 2022 – Tamika Lewis (St Joseph's)

Division 3
 2022 – Ruby Manson (Anglesea)

Sponsorship
The divisions has had the following organisations as naming rights partner for each season:
 2018:
 Epworth Health (Division 1)
 Corio Bay Health Group (Division 2)
 2019, 2021–22:
 Epworth Health (Divisions 1-3)

Representative Games
In May 2019, an AFL Barwon Women's Football representative team coached by Geelong AFLW player Melissa Hickey, and captained by Barwons Heads' Emma Allen, played the Northern Football Netball League.

References

External links
 Official website
 PlayHQ Results & Ladders (2022)

Australian rules football competitions in Victoria (Australia)
Women's Australian rules football leagues in Australia
Sport in Geelong
2018 establishments in Australia